The 1962 Denver Broncos season was the third season for the team in the American Football League (AFL). They finished with their best record of the decade with seven wins and seven losses, finishing second in the AFL's Western Division. The Broncos started the season strong with a record of 6–1, but went in reverse in the second half of the season with a 1–6 record. Despite this, head coach Jack Faulkner was named AFL Coach of the Year.

The 1962 season was the year in which Denver switched to their orange and blue color scheme, abandoning the brown and mustard yellow color scheme of the franchise's first two seasons. Orange and blue have been used as the team's primary colors ever since.

Personnel

Staff

Regular season

Standings

References

External links
 1962 Denver Broncos at Pro-Football-Reference.com

Denver Broncos seasons
Denver Broncos
1962 in sports in Colorado